Nemophas bicinctus is a species of beetle in the family Cerambycidae. It was described by Lansberge in 1880. It is known from Sulawesi and Moluccas.

References

bicinctus
Beetles described in 1880